The blacktip sea catfish (Plicofollis dussumieri), also known as the Dussumier's catfish, the giant marine cat fish, the Shupanga sea catfish, or the tropical seacatfish, is a species of catfish in the family Ariidae. It was described by Achille Valenciennes in 1840, originally under the genus Arius. It inhabits rivers and marine waters ranging between Africa and India in the Indo-western Pacific.

The blacktip sea catfish feeds on finfish and benthic invertebrates. It is harvested for its meat, which is marketed both fresh and dried-salted. Due to a lack of known significant threats to the species, it is currently ranked as Least Concern by the IUCN redlist.

References

Ariidae
Fish described in 1840